"The Work of Art in the Age of Mechanical Reproduction" (1935), by Walter Benjamin, is an essay of cultural criticism which proposes and explains that mechanical reproduction devalues the aura (uniqueness) of an objet d'art. That in the age of mechanical reproduction and the absence of traditional and ritualistic value, the production of art would be inherently based upon the praxis of politics. Written during the Nazi régime (1933–1945) in Germany, Benjamin presents a theory of art that is "useful for the formulation of revolutionary demands in the politics of art" in a mass culture society.

The subject and themes of Benjamin's essay: the aura of a work of art; the artistic authenticity of the artefact; its cultural authority; and the aestheticization of politics for the production of art, became resources for research in the fields of art history and architectural theory, cultural studies, and media theory.

The original essay, "The Work of Art in the Age of its Technological Reproducibility", was published in three editions: (i) the German edition, in 1935; (ii) the French edition, in 1936; and (iii) the German revised edition in 1939, from which derive the contemporary English translations of the essay titled "The Work of Art in the Age of Mechanical Reproduction".

Summary
In "The Work of Art in the Age of Mechanical Reproduction" (1935), Walter Benjamin presents the thematic basis for a theory of art by quoting the essay "The Conquest of Ubiquity" (1928), by Paul Valéry, to establish how works of art created and developed in past eras are different from contemporary works of art; that the understanding and treatment of art and of artistic technique must progressively develop in order to understand a work of art in the context of the modern time.

Artistic production 
In the Preface to the essay, Benjamin presents Marxist analyses of the organisation of a capitalist society and of the place of the arts in a capitalist society, both in the public sphere and in the private sphere; and explains the socio-economic conditions of society to extrapolate future developments of capitalism that will result in the economic exploitation of the proletariat, and so will produce the socio-economic conditions that would abolish capitalism.  By reviewing the historical and technological developments of the mechanical means for reproducing a work of art, Benjamin establishes that artistic reproduction is not a modern human activity, such as the industrial arts of the foundry and the stamp mill in Ancient Greece (12th–9th c. BC), and the modern arts of woodcut relief-printing and engraving, etching, lithography, and photography, which are industrial techniques of mass production that permit greater accuracy in the mechanical reproduction of a work of art than would an artist manually reproducing an artefact created by a master artist.

Authenticity 
The aura of a work of art derives from authenticity (uniqueness) and locale (physical and cultural); Benjamin explains that "even the most perfect reproduction of a work of art is lacking in one element: Its presence in time and space, its unique existence at the place where it happens to be" located. That the "sphere of [artistic] authenticity is outside the technical [sphere]" of mechanised reproduction. Therefore, in being unique, the original work of art is an objet d'art independent of the mechanically accurate reproduction; yet, by changing the cultural context of where the artwork is located, the existence of the mechanical copy (an art-product) diminishes the aesthetic value of the original work of art. In that way, the aura  the unique aesthetic authority of a work of art  is absent from the mechanically produced copy.

Value: cult and exhibition 
Regarding the social functions of an artefact, Benjamin said that "Works of art are received and valued on different planes. Two polar types stand out; with one, the accent is on the cult value; with the other, on the exhibition value of the work. Artistic production begins with ceremonial objects destined to serve in a cult. One may assume that what mattered was their existence, not their being on view." The cult value of religious art is in the fact that "certain statues of gods are accessible only to the priest in the cella; certain madonnas remain covered nearly all year round; certain sculptures on medieval cathedrals are invisible to the spectator on ground level." In practice, the diminished cult value of a religious artefact (an icon no longer venerated) increases the exhibition value of the artefact as art created for the spectators' appreciation, because "it is easier to exhibit a portrait bust, that can be sent here and there [to museums], than to exhibit the statue of a divinity that has its fixed place in the interior of a temple."

The mechanical reproduction of a work of art voids its cult value, because removal from a fixed, private space (a temple) and placement in a mobile, public space (a museum) allows exhibiting the work of art to many spectators. Further explaining the transition from cult value to exhibition value, Benjamin said that in "the photographic image, exhibition value, for the first time, shows its superiority to cult value." In emphasising exhibition value, "the work of art becomes a creation with entirely new functions," which "later may be recognized as incidental" to the original purpose for which the artist created the objet d'art.

As a medium of artistic production, the cinema (moving pictures) does not create cult value for the motion picture, itself, because "the audience's identification with the actor is really an identification with the camera. Consequently, the audience takes the position of the camera; [the audience's] approach is that of testing. This is not the approach to which cult values may be exposed." Therefore, "the film makes the cult value recede into the background, not only by putting the public in the position of the critic, but also by the fact that, at the movies, this [critical] position requires no attention."

Art as politics 

The social value of a work of art changes as a society change their value systems; thus the changes in artistic styles and in the cultural tastes of the public follow "the manner in which human sense-perception is organized [and] the [artistic] medium in which it is accomplished [are] determined not only by Nature, but by historical circumstances, as well." 

Despite the negative effects (social, economic, cultural) of mass-produced art-products upon the aura of the original work of art, Benjamin said that "the uniqueness of a work of art is inseparable from its being embedded in the fabric of tradition", which separates the original work of art from the reproduction. Moreover, Benjamin noted that the ritualization of the mechanical reproduction of art also emancipated "the work of art from its parasitical dependence on ritual", thereby increasing the social value of exhibiting works of art; a social and cultural practice that has progressed from the private sphere of life (the owner's enjoyment of the aesthetics of the artefacts, usually high art) to the public sphere of life, wherein the public enjoy the same aesthetics in a gallery displaying works of art.

Influence
In the late-twentieth-century television program Ways of Seeing (1972), John Berger proceeded from and developed the themes of "The Work of Art in the Age of Mechanical Reproduction" (1935), to explain the contemporary representations of social class and racial caste inherent to the politics and production of art. That in transforming a work of art into a commodity, the modern means of artistic production and of artistic reproduction have destroyed the aesthetic, cultural, and political authority of art: "For the first time ever, images of art have become ephemeral, ubiquitous, insubstantial, available, valueless, free," because they are commercial products that lack the aura of authenticity of the original objet d'art.

See also
Art for art's sake

References

External links
 Complete text of the essay, translated (Marxists.org)
 Complete text of the essay, translated (Massachusetts Institute of Technology)
 Zeitschrift für Sozialforschung (1932-1941) - Download the original text in French, "L'œuvre d'art à l'époque de sa reproduction méchanisée," in the Zeitschrift für Sozialforschung Jahrgang V, Félix Alcan, Paris, 1936, pp. 40–68 (23MB)
 Complete text in German
 Partial text of the essay, with commentary by Detlev Schöttker 
 A comment to the essay on diségno

Social philosophy
Aesthetics literature
1936 essays
Essays in literary theory
Works about avant-garde and experimental art
Works by Walter Benjamin
Contemporary philosophical literature
Books in philosophy of technology